Cloacina was a goddess who presided over the Cloaca Maxima ('Greatest Drain'), the main interceptor discharge outfall of the system of sewers in Rome.

Name 
The theonym Cloācīna is a derivative of the noun cloāca ('sewer, underground drainage'; cf. cluere 'to purify'), itself from Proto-Italic *klowā-, ultimately from Proto-Indo-European *ḱleuH-o- ('clean'). A cult-title of Venus, Cloācīna may be interpreted as meaning 'The Purifier'.

Cult 
The Cloaca Maxima was said to have been begun by Tarquinius Priscus, one of Rome's Etruscan kings, and finished by another, Tarquinius Superbus: Cloacina might have originally been an Etruscan deity. According to one of Rome's foundation myths, Titus Tatius, king of the Sabines, erected a statue to Cloacina at the place where Romans and Sabines met to confirm the end of their conflict, following the rape of the Sabine women. Tatius instituted lawful marriage between Sabines and Romans, uniting them as one people, ruled by himself and by Rome's founder, Romulus. The peace between Sabines and Romans was marked by a cleansing ritual using myrtle, at or very near an ancient Etruscan shrine to Cloacina, above a small stream that would later be enlarged as the main outlet for Rome's main sewer, the Cloaca Maxima. As myrtle was one of Venus' signs, and Venus was a goddess of union, peace and reconciliation, Cloacina was recognised as Venus Cloacina (Venus the Cleanser). She was also credited with the purification of sexual intercourse within marriage.

The small, circular shrine of Venus Cloacina was situated before the Basilica Aemilia on the Roman Forum and directly above the Cloaca Maxima.  Some Roman coins had images of Cloacina's shrine. The clearest show two females, presumed to be deities, each with a bird perched on a pillar. One holds a small object, possibly a flower; birds and flowers are signs of Venus, among other deities. The figures may have represented the two aspects of the divinity, Cloacina-Venus.

References

Bibliography

Further reading 
 Information on Cloacina

See also
 Toilet god

Love and lust goddesses
Roman goddesses
Toilet goddesses
Sewerage